Asura confina is a moth of the family Erebidae. It is found in New Guinea.

References

confina
Moths described in 1900
Moths of New Guinea